Khodzi is a settlement in the Java District or Dzau District in Ossetian, in South Ossetian  autonomy in Georgia.

See also
 Dzau district

Notes

References  

Populated places in Dzau District